Venice High School is a secondary school located in Venice, Florida which educates students in grades 9–12.

History 
Venice High School was built in the late 1940s in Nokomis, a short distance north of Venice. The high school (grades 6–8) opened in 1956 with John E. Davis as its first principal. Venice Junior High (grades 7–9) opened sometime in 1959 when the student body outgrew the high school. Guy Rose served as the first Vice Principal under Davis and was in charge of the Junior High. The original buildings remained mostly unchanged until 2012 when the high school and junior high were demolished (the original gymnasium and Powell–Davis Stadium remained) to build the facility that exists today. The campus was completed in 2014 including a new music suite housing the chorus and band and a city-mandated performing arts center.

In 2006, Venice High School was named an "A" school by the Florida Department of Education. In 2007, the school missed the 525 points needed for an "A" grade by 4 points receiving a score of 521 to earn a "B" grade. The school has increased its graduation rate from 63.9% in 1999 to 84.7% in 2007. Its dropout rate is 1.6%.

Venice is known for its athletics programs, including state championships in volleyball (1998, 2005, 2012, 2014, 2018) and baseball (2007, 2012, 2013, 2015, 2018, 2019). Venice's football program, coached by John Peacock, has been recognized as one of the best teams in the state, making several state championship appearances since their first in 2000 (7th in nation) and winning a second in 2017.

Venice High School has more than 3000 students located on the island of Venice.

Programs 

Featured programs include Career Technical Education: PC Support, Health Options, Digital Design, Early Childhood, Culinary Arts, Engineering and Business Entrepreneurial pathways.

Venice High School offers the International Baccalaureate (IB) Program which is an academically focused curriculum for students ages sixteen to eighteen (grades 11 and 12) preparing to enter university.

Unique to Venice High School is the Rotary Futures Program which assists students with postsecondary planning, college applications, and scholarship acquisition. This program has obtained millions of scholarship dollars for Venice High School seniors.

An annual Literacy Celebration which is held in January in partnership with the Gulf Coast Foundation of Venice.  Noted authors and Pulitzer Prize winners Tim O’Brien, Rich Bragg, and Alice Hoffman are among the featured guests.  These authors conduct student presentations and workshops prior to the evening event.

VHS has more than 65 community mentors/employers including Medical doctors, nursing, veterinarians, radiology, engineering, a variety of businesses, accounting, culinary, tourism and many more.

Venice Performing Arts Center 
Attached to Venice High School is the Venice Performing Arts Center (VPAC). This building includes the performing arts classes, which include band, orchestra, acting, and chorus.

At the VPAC, there is an apprenticeship program for Venice High School, in which juniors and seniors are able to gain theater and job experience, and help their community.

Student demographics 
Venice High School enrolls over 3,800 students annually, in contrast to the state average of 750 for K12 schools. Of those in attendance in 2005, 42% of the student body is Caucasian, 28% Hispanic, and 5% Asian and 25% African American. The school also has a significantly lower percentage of students eligible for the free or reduced lunch program compared to the state, 18% compared to 45.4%.

Competitive teams 
 Venice High School Athletics Achievements
Football State Champions- in 2000, 2017, & 2021
Baseball State Champions- 2007, 2012, 2013, 2015, 2018, & 2019
Volleyball State Champions- 1998, 2005, 2012, 2014, 2017 & 2022
Academic Olympics – Venice High School's Academic Olympics Team competes in the county and contributes to the Sarasota County All Star Team for the Commissioner's Academic Challenge (CAC) at the state level. The team most recently won the county championship in 2017.

Notable alumni 

 Dri Archer, running back, NFL player
 Alexandra Barreto, actress
 Trey Burton, tight end, NFL player
 Tyler Gauthier, NFL player
 Dalton Guthrie (born 1995), MLB player for the Phillies
 Mark Guthrie, MLB player and world series game winner
 Jon Knott, MLB player
 Forrest Lamp, Los Angeles Charger offensive line, NFL player
 Alvin Mitchell, football player
 Greg Pitts, actor
 Jack Voigt, MLB player and minor league coach

References

External links 
 
 Venice High School profile provided by schooltree.org

High schools in Sarasota County, Florida
Public high schools in Florida
1950 establishments in Florida
Educational institutions established in 1950